Robert, Rob, or Bob Dalton may refer to:

Robert Dalton (MP), English politician, Member of Parliament for Carlisle in 1558
Robert Dalton, actor in Secret Agent X-9 (1937 serial)
Bob Dalton (1868–1892), leader of the Dalton Gang in the American Old West
Bob Dalton, player on the national champion 1958–59 California Golden Bears men's basketball team
Robert Dalton, a character in UNIT: Snake Head

See also
Rob D'Alton (born 1923), Irish sailor